Kailash Sankhala (30 January 1925 – 15 August 1994) was an Indian biologist and conservationist. He was the Director of Delhi Zoological Park and Chief Wildlife Warden of Rajasthan. He is best known for his work in preserving tigers. Sankhala was the first Director of Project Tiger, a conservation programme set up in India in 1973. He was well known as "The Tiger Man of India". He was awarded the Padma Shri in 1992 and Rajasthan Ratan in 2013.

Wildlife manager
Sankhala started at the Forest Service in 1953. From 1953 to 1964, he managed wildlife sanctuaries in Sariska, Bharatpur, Banvihar and Ranthambhor, as well as forests in Rajasthan. In 1965, he was appointed Director of the Delhi Zoological Park. In 1973 he was appointed head of Project Tiger, an attempt to save the Indian tiger from extinction.

Tiger conservation
In 1971, Sankhala conducted a survey of the tiger population in India. His research later lead him to become the first Director of Project Tiger in 1973. Sankhala created the Tiger Trust in 1989. Sankhala's son, Pradeep Sankhala, took over the charge of the Tiger Trust after his father's death. Upon his death in 2003, his son Amit Sankhala stepped in.

Personal life
Kailash Sankhala was born in Jodhpur, Rajasthan on 30 January 1925. Sankhala died on 15 August 1994 in Jaipur.

Awards and honours
The Ministry of Environment and Forests established the Kailash Sankhala Fellowship award for conservation efforts in his honour.

Bibliography

See also
 Project Tiger
 Indira Gandhi
 Karan Singh
 Bengal tiger

References

Indian naturalists
1925 births
1994 deaths
Rajasthani people
Recipients of the Padma Shri in science & engineering
Indian environmentalists
People from Jodhpur
Jawaharlal Nehru Fellows
20th-century Indian biologists
Scientists from Rajasthan
20th-century naturalists